Sülze may refer to:

 Head cheese or brawn, a cut of meat
 Sülze (Bergen), a part of Bergen on the Lüneburg Heath in Germany
 Sülze Saltworks, on the Lüneburg Heath in Germany which was worked from the High Middle Ages to 1862
 Bad Sülze, a town in the Vorpommern-Rügen district, in Mecklenburg-Western Pomerania, Germany
 Sülze (Elbe), a river of Saxony-Anhalt, Germany, tributary of the Elbe
 Sülze (Werra), a river of Thuringia, Germany, tributary of the Werra
 Kleine Sülze, a river of Saxony-Anhalt, Germany, tributary of the Schrote
 Große Sülze, a river of Saxony-Anhalt, Germany, tributary of the Schrote